Frank Sargent Hoffman (February 9, 1852 - 1928) was an American philosopher who wrote on psychology and religion.

Hoffman was born in Sheboygan Falls, Wisconsin. In 1876 he graduated from Amherst College and obtained his PhD in 1896. He received a Bachelor of Divinity degree from Yale University. He was Professor of Philosophy at Union College. He contributed to The North American Review and was a member of the American Philosophical Association, American Psychology Society and the Phi Beta Kappa Society.

Hoffman's Psychology and Common Life (1903) received mixed reviews, a criticism was its overemphasise on psychical research.

Publications

Articles
Hoffman, Frank Sargent. (1900). The Scientific Method in Theology. The North American Review 170 (521): 575-584.
Hoffman, Frank Sargent. (1908). What Is Religion? The North American Review 187 (627): 231-239.

Books
The Sphere of the State: Or, the People as a Body-Politic (1894)
The Sphere of Science: A Study of the Nature and Method of Scientific Investigation (1898)
Psychology and Common Life (1903)
The Tales of Hoffman (1926)

References

1852 births
1928 deaths
Amherst College alumni
American philosophers
Parapsychologists
People from Sheboygan Falls, Wisconsin
Yale University alumni
Union College (New York) faculty
Philosophers from Wisconsin